Switzerland competed at the 1980 Winter Paralympics in Geilo, Norway. 27 competitors from Switzerland won 10 medals including 4 gold, 2 silver and 4 bronze and finished 5th in the medal table. All medals but one were won in alpine skiing.

Alpine skiing 

The medalists are:

  Rolf Heinzmann Men's Giant Slalom 3A
  Rolf Heinzmann Men's Slalom 3A
  Elizabeth Osterwalder Women's Giant Slalom 2B
  Elizabeth Osterwalder Women's Slalom 2B
  Felix Gisler Men's Giant Slalom 3B
  Heinz Moser Men's Giant Slalom 3A
  Eugen Diethelm Men's Giant Slalom 2A
  Franciane Fischer Women's Giant Slalom 3A
  Franciane Fischer Women's Slalom 3A

Cross-country 

Twelve athletes represented Switzerland at cross-country skiing. They won a bronze medal in the Men's 4x5 km Relay 1A+2A, however the athletes are unknown.

  Men's 4x5 km Relay 1A+2A

See also 

 Switzerland at the Paralympics
 Switzerland at the 1980 Winter Olympics

References 

1980
1980 in Swiss sport
Nations at the 1980 Winter Paralympics